Triplophysa hutjertjuensis is a species of stone loach found in Mongolia and China.

References

hutjertjuensis
Freshwater fish of China
Fish of Mongolia
Taxa named by Carl Hialmar Rendahl
Fish described in 1933